Events in the year 1831 in Norway.

Incumbents
Monarch: Charles III John

Events

Arts and literature
 The first opera was performed in Norway, Deux mots by Nicolas Dalayrac, it was performed in Oslo, directed by August Schrumpf with Augusta Smith in the main part. 
 Emilie da Fonseca is employed at Christiania Theatre.

Births
5 January – Niels Stockfleth Darre Eckhoff, architect (d.1914)
18 June – Peter Nicolai Arbo, painter (d.1892)
21 August – Hans Lars Helgesen, Member of the Legislative Assembly of British Columbia
4 November – Peter Andreas Blix, architect and engineer (d.1901)

Full date unknown
Hans Rasmus Astrup, politician (d.1898)
Louise Brun, actor (d.1866)
Svend Adolph Solberg, politician (d.1890)

Deaths
22 January – Johan August Sandels, soldier and politician (b.1764)
28 January – Hans Hein Nysom, priest and politician (b.1767)
 Hilchen Sommerschild

See also